Rogers Pass is a high mountain pass through the Selkirk Mountains of British Columbia, but the term also includes the approaches used by the Canadian Pacific Railway (CP) and the Trans-Canada Highway. In the heart of Glacier National Park, this tourism destination since 1886 is a National Historic Site.

Topography
Rogers Pass is the lowest route between the Sir Donald and Hermit ranges of the Selkirks, providing a shortcut along the southern perimeter of the Big Bend of the Columbia River from Revelstoke on the west to Donald, near Golden, on the east.

The pass is formed by the headwaters of the Illecillewaet River to the west and by the Beaver River to the east. These rivers are tributaries of the Columbia, which arcs to the north.

Railway

Proposal & planning
During the 1870s, when the transcontinental was being planned, the preferred route through the Canadian Rockies was the northerly Yellowhead Pass. After awarding the contract, the government allowed CP to amend the designated crossing to the Kicking Horse Pass. Although believing the change advantageous, hindsight indicates the Yellowhead and CP's 1898 Crowsnest Pass would have provided a more economical and strategic combination. Poor judgement best describes this unfortunate decision that created lasting impediments for both the railway and highway.

Discovery of the pass

While the transcontinental advanced across the prairies, the railway sought a way over the unexplored Selkirks. In April 1881, CP offered Major A.B. Rogers naming rights and a $5,000 bonus to locate a pass. Walter Moberly had discovered Eagle Pass just to the west, and based on suggestions in Moberly's reports, Rogers started out from what is now Revelstoke, up the Illecillewaet River. On May 28, 1881, the party followed a branch of the river past "Syndicate Peak" (now Mount Sir Donald), discovering a large level opening between the mountains where the waters flowed east and west. (Some secondary sources state that Rogers only saw the pass from a distance, but this is contradicted by first-hand reports.) To get a better view of the landscape, Rogers, his nephew A.L. Rogers and some of their Shuswap guides then climbed to the crest of a nearby mountain ridge, later identified as the ridge between Mount Macdonald and Avalanche Mountain. From here they could see the Beaver River valley on the east side of the Selkirks. Running out of food, the party turned back west. Returning in 1882 from the east, Rogers followed the Beaver River and Connaught Creek (formerly Bear Creek), and on July 24, 1882 he reached the same pass, confirming its existence and the feasibility of a railway route. Rogers refused to cash the $5,000 cheque, and instead framed it upon his wall until CP General Manager William Cornelius Van Horne offered him a gold watch as an incentive to cash it. Folklore has generated many later variations of this story.

The discovery was due in part to the efforts of Moberly, his assistant Albert Perry and their First Nations guides, who had explored the Illecillewaet River on the west side of the pass fifteen year earlier. In later life Moberly stated that Perry reached the pass in 1866, but there is no contemporaneous evidence for this.

Planning & construction
Rogers blindly believed the pass presented no special engineering difficulties. By May 1883, the westward railhead had only reached Medicine Hat, still leaving time to find an alternative to the equally problematic Kicking Horse Pass. Moberly advocated Howse Pass. During the time it took to determine a practicable Kicking Horse/Selkirks route, the railhead had advanced up the Bow Valley making it too late to use Howse, which required an access from the North Saskatchewan River Valley.

Since the immediate capital costs for the Selkirks and Big Bend options were similar, the additional operating costs expected from the increased mileage eliminated the latter. As a general rule, if the interest payable on a capital investment was less than the expected savings on operating costs, CP made the investment. Decisions were a trade-off between immediate costs and delayed costs. Later traffic revenue enabled upgrades.

The acute capital shortage during 1885, meant months of unpaid payroll, and minor strikes. Captain Steele and his small North-West Mounted Police force protected construction manager Ross from confrontations with workers. When the Riel Rebellion drew Steele away, Ross formed his own 25-man armed police force. To survive the capital crisis, infrastructure costs were reduced to a bare minimum. Not only did untreated wooden trestles provide all bridging, but cuttings were of minimum width, track was not ballasted, and no snow sheds were built. Ballasting only occurred three years later. Although accurately predicting construction costs was difficult, especially in a mountainous region, total overruns were reasonable.

The eastern approach up the Beaver River required some of the largest trestles on the line.

In early February 1885, three avalanches struck. At the summit, three occupants escaped through a camp store window. Later that month avalanches totally destroyed the store, and buried six men in the vicinity. These slides, followed by heavy summer rainfall, delayed the work. Abandoning the damaged right-of-way on the western slope, north of the river, CP built the switchback Loops well clear of avalanche paths.

The railhead crossed the summit that August. After the last spike ceremony that November, the line was shut down for the winter. After slide damages were repaired, the line opened to through traffic the following June.

Route

 Only the crest and eastern slope of the Connaught Tunnel route is underground.

Early operation

CP's traffic predictions proved largely correct. Contrary claims that early traffic would be mainly eastbound were unfounded, but became a reality within 20 years. Two pusher locomotives, each needing crews, were adequate for each side. However, pusher gradients were expensive to operate. Most loaded freight trains required a single pusher, because they were longer than 9 cars. Wyes were at the Selkirk pushing extremities of Beavermouth (east) and Albert Canyon (west). At the summit, a roundhouse and rail yard existed. Some days no freight trains passed, but on the arrival of a steamer in Vancouver, there could be a quick succession eastward for several days. Double heading replaced rear pushing from 1907. Local traffic was negligible.

Usually, passenger trains did not need pushers, and until 1902, the 5–  to 9–car service was daily. On rare occasions, trains were as long as 12 cars. By 1913, to maintain this speed, the 9-car trains required a pusher. Scheduled stops for breakfast, lunch, and dinner existed at Field, Glacier House, and North Bend. Albert Canyon was a scenic stop. The twice daily summer service from 1908 continued into the winter, instead of reducing to one train, and increased to three trains the following summer.

In 1905, CP installed a water-powered bucket system to fill the coal hopper. The next year, the four-locomotive engine house was enlarged to accommodate six locomotives. In 1907, a track deviation created more yard space to handle increased freight. Housing key staff and extensive equipment, the pass functioned as if it were a divisional point. Assigning the most powerful locomotives, the Selkirk section had 12 in 1898 and 18 in 1908. Pushers increased from 5 in 1908 to 11 in 1914. Oil storage facilities were built for the 1912 conversion to oil-fired locomotives in the mountains, eliminating firemen and fire patrols. Additionally, the constant steam pressure increased the tonnage capacity.

In 1915, seven employees received 25-month sentences for creating ghost employees.

One year after the tunnel opening, the right-of-way over the pass was handed over to the Parks Department  for a wagon road, and the snow sheds were removed. Some sections of the abandoned railway eventually became walking rail trails in Glacier National Park.

Avalanches

The extent and cost of snow sheds had been grossly underestimated. Snow shed construction continued until 1890, but only in places displaying consistent problems, and only where diversions were not a cheaper option. Sheds were patrolled in winter for avalanche damage, and in summer for fires started by smokestacks. An increased section gang shovelled out both slides and drifts. Wing plows could not disperse the really deep snow. A rotary snowplow was shared with Eagle Pass until a dedicated one arrived in February 1890. However, rotaries cannot handle avalanches containing rocks or timber. These combined measures ensured that blockages from 1889/90 onward were nearly always cleared within hours.

During the first 25 years of the line, 200 people died in avalanches. Single avalanches killed 6 employees in 1887, 7 or 8 in 1899, and about 60 in the 1910 catastrophe. The failure to rebuild snow sheds after the prior track deviation, and the inadequate design strength of an existing shed, proved devastating. On at least four occasions, avalanches struck passenger trains in the pass, seemingly causing no passenger injuries.

During summer months, trains ran on separate tracks outside the sheds. Although the tunnel removed the avalanche danger for that section, the problem persisted along neighbouring segments.

Community
In 1886, the features of a transient construction community remained. Drinking and gambling characterized the 15 hotels. A single provincial police officer maintained the peace. Transitioning to respectability, formal dances were held. The hamlet of about 50, included two general stores, two hotels, a butcher, a barber, and CP boarding house.

Storekeeper James M. Carroll was postmaster 1890–1892, his store appearing to have barely outlasted his competitor. In 1893, the Queens Hotel, the only one remaining, was renamed the Dewdrop Inn. William Cator, CP agent, was postmaster 1893–1899. In 1899, the population was 25–30, a community newspaper operated, and a school existed. John Taylor, CP agent, was postmaster 1899–1901.

When the station relocated, the community buildings followed suit. Public functions were initially held in the CP boarding house. Residents built a new boarding house for the manager, after she was terminated for not housing scabs during a strike.

C.D. Morris, who opened a store within a tent in 1901, erected a permanent store, boarding house and hall. Lodge, church, and public gatherings used this hall. In 1904, he added 15 or 16 bedrooms and a bathroom to the boarding house to cater for the big summer demand from workers and tourists. He was postmaster 1901–1903.
His store clerk, John O. Forbes, and brother, William B. Morris, later filled the role. A 1910 fire destroyed this hotel/boarding house. The store was saved, but badly scorched. The 1916 fire that destroyed the Morris store and residence preceded the move to the new community of Glacier near the west portal. The school similarly relocated.

Superseding tunnels
Beneath Rogers Pass are the  Connaught Tunnel (1916) and the  Mount Macdonald Tunnel (1988). The former once held, and the latter still holds, the title of longest railway tunnel in North America. Connaught handles eastbound traffic, and Mount Macdonald westbound.

Trans-Canada Highway

Proposal
In 1908, a new wagon road was built from Laggan. Two decades later, a proper highway linked Lake Louise and Golden. The selection of a Golden–Revelstoke link via the  longer Big Bend, rather than over the Selkirks, was the snowplowing difficulty. This road finally opened in 1940. A proposal to upgrade to Trans-Canada Highway standards a decade later, determined that the Selkirks route would be cheaper, and not conflict with the Columbia River hydro-electric potential.

Construction & opening
The former schoolhouse was the dining hall, a former railway house the office, and prefabricated cabins housed the employees. Radio reception was poor. Entertainment, such as movies, or a haircut, required train travel to the nearest towns. Similarly, all supplies came in by train for the workforce of about 500 who built the  highway.

West of the summit, much of the original route was used. To the east, excavations uncovered the remnants of the roundhouse destroyed by the 1899 slide. The provincial government held an official opening ceremony in July 1962, whereas the federal one was the following September. This scenic route reduced bus travel time by five hours.

Avalanche control
Prior to 1962, snow sheds provided the only control measure. Three concrete sheds exist on the eastern slope. To keep the highway and railway open during the winter, the Royal Canadian Artillery has since used  howitzers to knock down unstable snow under controlled circumstances to reduce avalanche hazards. Stopping is prohibited in high-risk locations.

Facilities
Camping, cabins, and an information centre make up the Glacier park facilities. The Northlander Motor Hotel, opened in 1964, was renamed Glacier Park Lodge. After expiring in 2010, the lease continued on a month to month basis. The new owners, who acquired the property in 2008, failed to meet their legal obligations to the previous owners, Parks Canada, and others. Parks Canada terminated the lease in 2012. The gas station and lodge, closed in 2009 and 2012 respectively, were both demolished in 2018.

Non-avalanche accidents & emergencies

Climate
With an average  snowfall per year, Rogers Pass is among the snowiest places in Canada. Encompassing 134 individual paths in the steep terrain, avalanches are common in winter.

See also
Canadian Rockies
Other CPR grades in British Columbia: Field Hill, Big Hill, Spiral Tunnels, Eagle Pass

Footnotes

References

Selkirk Mountains
Columbia Country
Mountain passes of British Columbia
Heritage sites in British Columbia
Canadian Pacific Railway
Rail mountain passes of British Columbia
National Historic Sites in British Columbia
Glacier National Park (Canada)